Lumo is a British open-access operator owned by FirstGroup that operates passenger trains on the East Coast Main Line between  and . It is headquartered in Newcastle upon Tyne.

Lumo originated in 2015 with the submission of a bid by FirstGroup to the Office of Rail and Road (ORR) to establish a new open-access operator to use additional rail paths on East Coast Main Line. It faced competition from Alliance Rail Holdings, whose bid was rejected due to high estimated revenue abstraction from the existing franchised operator. In May 2016, the ORR granted a ten-year track access agreement to the FirstGroup subsidiary East Coast Trains Limited, which would later be rebranded as Lumo. During March 2019, a £100million order for five Class 803 electric multiple unit high speed trains was placed to operate Lumo's services.

Lumo's inaugural service was conducted on 25 October 2021. Initial operations involved the running of two trains per day in each direction on most week days; this was expanded to five trains per day by early 2022. Onboard catering is available, consisting of an at-seat trolley service, while an identical all-standard class 2-by-2 seating arrangement is present in every carriage. Lumo refers to itself as being a “digital-first” operator, practising paperless ticketing and seeking to make booking tickets as easy as possible.

History
During 2015, in response to an announcement by the Office of Rail and Road (ORR) that it would be allowing open-access operators to bid for additional rail paths on the East Coast Main Line in addition to those of the existing franchised operator Virgin Trains East Coast (VTEC), the British transport conglomerate FirstGroup submitted a proposal to operate services between London and Edinburgh. Under this plan, FirstGroup proposed to directly compete with existing road, rail and air services by offering all-standard class seating with an average ticket price of approximately £25. A competing application from Alliance Rail Holdings was also submitted, but was rejected by the ORR after the revenue abstraction from VTEC had been estimated at £115million; in comparison, FirstGroup's proposal was predicted to result in £7.9million of abstracted revenue.

During May 2016, the ORR granted a ten-year track access agreement to the FirstGroup subsidiary East Coast Trains Limited, under which it would be allowed to operate up to five services in each direction from May 2021. It would be the third such open access operator on the East Coast Main Line, the prior two being Hull Trains and Grand Central. It was acknowledged at the time of the application's granting that services were not expected to commence until 2021 as to allow the new operator to acquire new-build rolling stock.

In September 2021, the company's launch was confirmed alongside the adoption of the Lumo brand, which was described by the company as a combination of luminosity (Lu) and motion (mo). Two months later, Lumo moved to its permanent headquarters in Newcastle upon Tyne. During June 2022, it was announced that Martijn Gilbert had been appointed as the new managing director for both Lumo and Hull Trains, succeeding Phil Cameron and David Gibson respectively.

Services

On 26 May 2021, the first trial runs of the company's Class 803 high speed multiple units on the national rail network were conducted.

On 25 October 2021, the inaugural service commenced; initially, Lumo operated two trains per day in each direction on most week days, although Saturdays saw only one train being run for a time. From the onset of operations, the service rate was set to be progressively increased up to running five trains each way by early 2022. At launch, Lumo promised that 60% of fares would be offered for no more than £30, with a cap of £69 on one-way tickets. According to the company, ticket sales around the launch date had exceeded expectations, and it had experienced particularly high demand for its weekend services.

As of 2023, Lumo's timetable sees trains depart each terminus at off-peak times. The fastest service reaches London from Edinburgh in four hours and three minutes, although the majority take around four hours and 30 minutes.

Operations

Lumo offers a single-class service, with free Wi-Fi connectivity for all passengers. There is no dynamic pricing structure, the company instead favouring fixed fares with no observation of peak time ticketing. Lumo promotes itself as being a “digital-first” operator, having invested in paperless ticketing and a simplified website to make browsing and booking tickets as easy as possible. It also participates in the National Rail system and accepts interoperable tickets.

Onboard catering is available, consisting of an at-seat trolley service, while additional food and drink items from brands such as Marks & Spencer are available for pre-order by passengers for delivery mid-service. Efforts have been made to cater to as diverse a range of dietary requirements as possible; around 50 per cent of all food serviced is plant-based, while the use of meat and dairy products has been intentionally minimised.

An identical 2-by-2 seating arrangement is fitted throughout all five carriages; a pair of table seating per carriage is also available. These ergonomically designed wingback seats are furnished with various amenities, including individual lighting and electric sockets, fold-down tables, and shaping to provide a greater sense of privacy. Priority seats are also present, along with two spaces for wheelchair users, on each train. Various forms of media content, including films and television shows, can be streamed by passengers using the company's mobile app.

Rolling stock

Services are operated by a fleet of  Class 803 electric multiple unit trains, ordered in March 2019 at a cost of £100million, financed by the rail leasing company Beacon Rail. While based on the same Hitachi AT300 design as the Class 801 Azuma trains operated on the East Coast Main Line by franchised operator London North Eastern Railway (LNER), they are not fitted with an auxiliary diesel engine, but instead feature batteries intended solely to power onboard facilities in case of overhead line equipment failure. Other changes include an all-standard class seating configuration, as well as the lack of a galley area, although catering services are provided through the use of a trolley service. The Class 803 also features air conditioning, power sockets and Wi-Fi provision.

Accidents and incidents
The Rail Accident Investigation Branch opened an investigation.

References

External links

 

FirstGroup railway companies
Open-access train operating companies
Railway companies established in 2021
British companies established in 2015
Low-cost high-speed rail services